Suqovuşan may refer to:
 Suqovuşan, Dashkasan, Azerbaijan
 Suqovuşan, Sabirabad, Azerbaijan
 Suqovuşan, Tartar, Azerbaijan